Anton Moravčík (3 June 1931 in Komárno – 12 December 1996 in Bratislava) was a Slovak football player.

He played for several clubs, including Iskra Žilina, ÚDA Prague and Slovan Bratislava.

He played for the Czechoslovakia national team (25 matches/10 goals) and was a participant at the 1958 FIFA World Cup and the 1955-60 Central European International Cup, which Czechoslovakia national team won, with him being his teams joint top scorer.

International 
Czechoslovakia
 Central European International Cup: 1955-60

References 

 
 
 

1931 births
1996 deaths
Slovak footballers
Czechoslovak footballers
1958 FIFA World Cup players
1960 European Nations' Cup players
Czechoslovakia international footballers
Dukla Prague footballers
ŠK Slovan Bratislava players
MŠK Žilina players
Sportspeople from Komárno
Association football midfielders